Lindsay Davison (born 11 October 1941) is an Australian former cricketer. He played one first-class cricket match for Victoria in 1962.

See also
 List of Victoria first-class cricketers

References

External links
 

1941 births
Living people
Australian cricketers
Victoria cricketers
Cricketers from Melbourne